Aristolochia baetica, the Andalusian Dutchman's pipe or pipe vine, is a poisonous perennial vine that occurs in North Africa and the southern Iberian Peninsula, from Algeria to Portugal.

Description
Aristolochia baetica is a rarely procumbent evergreen climber with triangular, cordate, glaucous lobes a quarter the size of the leaves. Flowers vary from 2 to 5 centimetres and are from brownish-purple to reddish.

References

External links

baetica
Vines
Plants described in 1753
Taxa named by Carl Linnaeus